Linda Fruhvirtová (born 1 May 2005) is a Czech professional tennis player. On 30 January 2023, she achieved career-high WTA rankings of 51 in singles and 253 in doubles.

She made her WTA Tour main-draw debut at the 2020 Prague Open, where she was in receipt of a main-draw wildcard. She won her maiden WTA singles title at the 2022 Chennai Open.

Early life and background
Born on 1 May 2005 in the Czech Republic, Linda has a younger sister, Brenda (born 2007), who is also a tennis player. Linda and Brenda are recipients of Patrick Mouratoglou's foundation. Linda has been training at the Mouratoglou Academy in Southern France since 2017; she also trained at the Evert Tennis Academy in January 2021.

Junior career
At the junior level, Fruhvirtová won the singles and doubles titles of the Petits As tournament. Her sister Brenda won the singles title the year after, making them the first members of the same family to win the title for two consecutive years.

Linda Fruhvirtová achieved an ITF Junior career-high ranking of world No. 2, on 13 December 2021. Since that time she managed to climb to the WTA ranking of world No. 151, on 1 August 2022.

Junior Grand Slam performance
Singles:
 Australian Open: 1R (2020)
 French Open: 2R (2020, 2021)
 Wimbledon: SF (2021)
 US Open: 3R (2021)

Doubles:
 Australian Open: SF (2020)
 French Open: QF (2021)
 Wimbledon: SF (2021)
 US Open: QF (2021)

Professional career

2020–21: WTA Tour and top 300 debut 
Fruhvirtová made her WTA Tour main-draw debut at the 2020 Prague Open, receiving wildcards into the singles and doubles draws. 

She also received a wildcard from the 2021 Miami Open for the qualifying where she was defeated in the first round by Nina Stojanović. 
In April, she received a wildcard for the main draw at the WTA 250 MUSC Health Open where she won her first WTA singles match when Alizé Cornet retired in the third set. She progressed through the quarterfinals by defeating Emma Navarro in straight sets in the next round, before losing to eventual champion Astra Sharma. Linda, at only 15, was the youngest player at that time in the top 400 of the WTA rankings.

She played another WTA 250 main draw in Cleveland as lucky loser. She defeated Tara Moore before losing to Magda Linette in two tight sets. She ended season reaching quarterfinals at the WTA 125 Korea Open before losing to Ekaterina Kazionova, in three sets.

2022: First WTA title, WTA 1000 fourth round, Major & top 100 debut

Fruhvirtová received a main-draw wildcard for the Miami Open. In the first round, she defeated Danka Kovinić for her first WTA 1000-level victory. In the second round, she recorded the biggest victory of her career, defeating 20th seed and world No. 24, Elise Mertens, for her first victory over a top 25 opponent. She then recorded her first victory over a top 20 opponent, defeating former world No. 1, Victoria Azarenka, which secured her a debut in the top 200 after the tournament.

At the US Open, she succeeded in getting to the main-draw after three qualifying wins for her Grand Slam debut. In her debut Grand Slam main-draw match, she defeated Wang Xinyu. Her journey then was stopped by Garbiñe Muguruza who eliminated her in the following round.

At the Chennai Open, she won her first WTA Tour title when she beat Magda Linette in the final, in three sets. With this win, she moved into the top 100 for the first time in her career, at No. 74 in the rankings.

2023: Australian Open debut & fourth round
On her debut at the 2023 Australian Open, she reached the fourth round of a Major defeating compatriot Markéta Vondroušová.

Performance timeline

Only main-draw results in WTA Tour, Grand Slam tournaments, Billie Jean King Cup and Olympic Games are included in win–loss records.

Singles
Current after the 2023 Indian Wells Open.

Doubles
Current after the 2023 Indian Wells Open.

WTA career finals

Singles: 1 (1 title)

ITF Circuit finals

Singles: 5 (3 titles, 2 runner–ups)

Doubles: 3 (2 titles, 1 runner–up)

Record against other players

Record against top 10 players 

 She has a 0–2 record against players who were, at the time the match was played, ranked in the top 10.

Notes

References

External links
 
 

2005 births
Living people
Czech female tennis players
Tennis players from Prague
21st-century Czech women